The John Olerud Two-Way Player of the Year Award (known colloquially as the John Olerud Award) is a college baseball award given to the best two-way player of the season. The award is named after former Washington State Cougars All-American pitcher and first baseman John Olerud. The current holder of the award is Paul Skenes of the Air Force Falcons.

Winners

See also

List of college baseball awards
Baseball awards#U.S. college baseball
College Baseball Hall of Fame

References

External links

College baseball trophies and awards in the United States
Awards established in 2010